Cömert is a Turkish word meaning "generous" and may refer to:

Surname
 Ahmet Cömert (1926–1990), Turkish amateur boxer, coach, referee, boxing judge and sports official
 Eray Cömert (born 1998), Swiss professional footballer 
 Faruk Cömert (born 1946), Turkish Air Force general

Other uses
 Cömert, Ilgaz
 Ahmet Cömert Sport Hall, a multi-purpose sports venue in Bakırköy, Istanbul